Grease ant can refer to:
Linepithema humile
Solenopsis molesta